Micrixalus fuscus (dusky torrent frog or brown tropical frog) is a species of small frog found in dense forested hill streams in the Western Ghats of India. M. herrei was formerly synonymized within this species.

Description
Males measure  and females  in snout–vent length. Male Micrixalus fuscus have a single vocal sac, a white patch on the lower jaw, and a prominent nuptial pad on the first finger. Characteristic for the genus, they display the "foot-flagging" behavior, where males tap their hindfeet and extend it, then stretching it out and shaking the foot at prospective mates and rival males. Male-male combats also involve kicking.

Description from G. A. Boulenger's (1890) "Fauna of British India":
 Snout pointed, prominent, generally longer than the orbital diameter; canthus rostralis angular: loreal region flat, vertical; nostril halfway between the eye and the tip of the snout; interorbital space as broad as the upper eyelid; tympanum small, indistinct. Toes nearly entirely webbed; disks moderate; subarticular tubercles small; a small inner metatarsal tubercle. The tibio-tarsal articulation reaches between the eye and the tip of the snout. Skin smooth above and beneath; a narrow glandular lateral fold; a fold from the eye to the shoulder. Brown or pinkish above; sides of head and body generally darker; limbs with dark cross bands; hinder side of thighs dark brown, with a more or less accentuated light median stripe; whitish beneath, marbled with brown. Male with two internal vocal sacs, the openings of which are very small. From snout to vent 1.2 inches.

Habitat
The natural habitats of this species are fast-flowing streams covered by forest canopy. It is relatively abundant where it has been found.

References

fuscus
Amphibians described in 1882
Frogs of India
Endemic fauna of the Western Ghats